State Highway 59 (SH 59) is a New Zealand state highway in the Wellington Region linking Mackays Crossing (near Paekākāriki) to Linden.  It came into existence on 7 December 2021, prior to the opening of the Transmission Gully Motorway and consists of the former route of State Highway 1 between Mackays Crossing and Linden.

Route

State Highway 59 leaves State Highway 1 at the Mackays Crossing Interchange, the point where the northern end of the Transmission Gully Motorway meets the southern end of the Kapiti Expressway.  The route heads to the south-west and passes through Paekākāriki, before travelling along the Centennial Highway through to Pukerua Bay along a narrow strip of land between the Paekākāriki Escarpment and the Tasman Sea, shared with the North Island Main Trunk railway line.  After Pukerua Bay, the route becomes a dual carriageway through to Plimmerton, before narrowing to a single carriageway through Mana.  South of Mana, the route crosses over the Porirua Harbour at Paremata; here, the route intersects with the western terminus of State Highway 58 at a roundabout.

A short distance south, as the route enters Wellington City in the northern suburb of Linden, the southern end of the Transmission Gully Motorway carrying SH 1 merges on to the Johnsonville-Porirua Motorway. The SH 59 designation ends at this point, with the Johnsonville-Porirua Motorway carrying the SH 1 designation as it continues south to Johnsonville and Wellington.

History
The original route north of Wellington known as the Centennial Highway from Ngauranga to Paekākāriki was started in 1936 and opened on 4 November 1939. The Centennial Highway project involved an upgrade of the Ngauranga Gorge road and provided a new route from Paremata to Paekākāriki, bypassing the winding road along the southern harbour edge from Paremata to Pāuatahanui (now part of State Highway 58) and the tortuous narrow winding Paekākāriki Hill Road between Pāuatahanui and Paekākāriki. It followed a new route, bridging the narrow channel between Paremata and the Mana isthmus and following the eastern edge of the Taupō swamp north of Plimmerton before climbing to the Pukerua Bay saddle and descending to follow the coastline to Paekākāriki.

During the 1950s and 1960s, the route south of Porirua was replaced in stages by the Johnsonville–Porirua Motorway.

In Porirua city, in the 1990s, the road was widened to four lanes and realigned to ease curves from just south of Pukerua Bay to Mana. In 2005–2006, the route through Mana was upgraded with extra lanes to provide dual carriageways through Mana during peak periods and the installation of traffic lights to regulate cross traffic. A second bridge was added to four-lane the connection of the Mana isthmus to Paremata.

Originally part of State Highway 1, the route was renumbered State Highway 59 on 7 December 2021, shortly before the opening of the Transmission Gully Motorway.  SH 1 was shifted to the Transmission Gully Motorway to reflect its purpose as the new main route north of Wellington, with the existing route remaining a state highway due to its strategic importance to the regional transport network.

The stretch along the coast between Paekākāriki and Pukerua Bay is prone to slips, part of the reason the inland route through Transmission Gully was preferred for greater resiliency to natural disasters. In its first year of being State Highway 59, the highway was closed twice due to weather events causing flooding and slips, the third time the coastal road was closed in the space of a year.

Major junctions

References

External links
New Zealand Transport Agency

59
Transport in the Wellington Region